The men's 400 metre freestyle event at the 2012 Summer Olympics took place on 28 July at the London Aquatics Centre in London, United Kingdom.

Sun Yang made a historic milestone to become China's first ever male gold medalist in swimming, as he continued to build another Asian supremacy for the event, together with an Olympic record. He held off South Korea's defending champion Park Tae-hwan on the final stretch to effortlessly secure the gold medal in a sterling time of 3:40.14, cutting off Ian Thorpe's 2000 Olympic record by nearly half a second.

Meanwhile, Park ended a dramatic day with a silver medal in his pocket at 3:42.06. Earlier in the prelims, he was disqualified for an immediate false start from heat three, but reinstated in the final after the Korean Swimming Federation filed an appeal. U.S. swimmer Peter Vanderkaay added a second individual bronze and fourth career medal to his Olympic hardware in 3:44.69.

China's Hao Yun (3:46.02), Vanderkaay's teammate Conor Dwyer (3:46.39), Hungary's Gergő Kis (3:47.03), Great Britain's David Carry (3:48.62), and Australia's Ryan Napoleon (3:49.25) also vied for an Olympic medal to round out the championship field.

Notable swimmers missed the final roster including Canada's Ryan Cochrane, who was bumped out of the lineup to ninth (3:47.26) after Park's disqualification had been overturned; and Biedermann, who struggled to keep his form with a thirteenth-place effort in the prelims (3:48.50).

Records
Prior to this competition, the existing world and Olympic records were as follows.

The following records were established during the competition:

Results

Heats

Final

References

External links
NBC Olympics Coverage

Men's 00400 metre freestyle
Men's events at the 2012 Summer Olympics